Johann Frank (14 May 1938 –  2 January 2010) was an Austrian football player and coach. He played for FC Wien, SC Schwechat and Austria Wien. He coached Schwechat and Neusiedl.

References

Johann Frank at Austria-archiv.at 

1938 births
2010 deaths
Austrian footballers
Austria international footballers
Austrian football managers
FK Austria Wien players
1. Simmeringer SC managers
Wiener Sport-Club managers
Association football defenders